William L. Abbey is a former American football coach. He was served as the head football coach at Southern Oregon College of Education—now known as Southern Oregon University—in Ashland, Oregon for the 1951 season, compiling a record of 1–8

Head coaching record

References

1920s births
Year of birth uncertain
Possibly living people
Southern Oregon Raiders football coaches
University of Oregon alumni